Charles Edwin Bishop (June 8, 1921 – January 14, 2012) was an American academic. He was chancellor of the University of Houston System from 1980 to 1986, president of the University of Arkansas from 1974 to 1980, and chancellor of the University of Maryland, College Park from 1970 to 1974. Bishop attended Berea College, the University of Kentucky, and University of Chicago.  He had a B.S. in agriculture educations, an M.S. in agriculture economics, and a Ph.D. in economics. He also taught at North Carolina State University and served as vice president of the University of North Carolina.

External links 

 Charles E. Bishop photographs at the University of Maryland Libraries

References

1921 births
2012 deaths
Berea College alumni
University of Kentucky alumni
University of Chicago alumni
Leaders of the University of Arkansas
Presidents of the University of Maryland, College Park
Chancellors of the University of Houston System
People from Spartanburg County, South Carolina